Drobo was a manufacturer of a series of external storage devices for computers, including DAS, SAN, and NAS appliances. Drobo devices can house up to four, five, eight, or twelve 3.5" or 2.5" Serial ATA or Serial Attached SCSI hard disk drives and connect with a computer or network via USB 2.0, USB 3.0, FireWire 800, eSATA, Gigabit Ethernet or Thunderbolt. Drobo devices are primarily designed to allow installation and removal of hard disk drives without requiring manual data migration, for increasing storage capacity of the unit without downtime, and for data protection against drive failure.

The company Drobo, Inc. changed its name from Data Robotics in 2011 since the familiarity with the Drobo name (which had only been the name of their product line until then) far exceeded the Data Robotics name.  Drobo, Inc. merged with Connected Data, Inc. in June 2013, with the new company taking the Connected Data name. In May 2015, the storage appliance business was spun-off as Drobo, Inc. and acquired by an investment group composed of seasoned tech executives Drobo was later acquired by StorCentric in August, 2018.  All Drobo products have been out of stock or severely inventory constrained in both the Drobo Store and retail channels since the beginning of 2020.  Drobo initially blamed this on supply chain issues caused by the COVID-19 pandemic.  In November, 2021, Drobo stated that more devices would be available in "the next few months"., however, as of February, 2023, product is still not available.

As of 20th June 2022, StorCentric filed for bankruptcy.

Products

Overview

Consumer models

* Plus one mSATA SSD slot for Data-Aware Tiering
**Plus one 128 GB mSATA SSD card for Data-Aware Tiering
***Plus one 2.5" SATA SSD bay for Data-Aware Tiering

Business models

References

External links
 

Computer storage devices
Linux-based devices
Computer storage companies
Server appliance
Companies that filed for Chapter 11 bankruptcy in 2022